Bălțățeni or Băltățeni may refer to several villages in Romania:
 Băltățeni, a village in Băcani Commune, Vaslui County
 Bălțățeni, a village in Tomșani Commune, Vâlcea County